Piano Lessons is a 2009 award-winning non-fiction book by Australian classical pianist Anna Goldsworthy, artist in residence of Janet Clarke Hall and artistic director of the Port Fairy Spring Music Festival.

In Piano Lessons, Goldsworthy documents her piano study from a young age under the Russian emigre Eleonora Sivan.

Originally published in Australia in October 2009 by Black Inc, the US rights were sold to American publisher St. Martin's Press

The film rights to the book have been sold to director Ana Kokkinos.

Synopsis
Goldsworthy was nine years old when she met Eleonora Sivan, a charismatic Russian émigré and world-class pianist who became her piano teacher. Piano Lessons documents what Sivan brought to Goldsworthy's lessons: a love of music, a respect for life, a generous spirit and the courage to embrace a musical life.

Critical reception 
The US Poet Laureate, Philip Levine, said of Piano Lessons, "I have never read a better depiction of a great mentor and of how true learning takes place. Every teacher of anything should read this book. Twice."

The book was received positively by Australian critics.

The Australian Literary Review called Piano Lessons a "wonderful story, elegantly told", broadsheet The Age said that it was "multi-layered, rich with meditations on identity, creativity, ambition and achievement; deeply felt without a hint of sentimentality. This impressive debut will surely mark Anna Goldsworthy's arrival as an Australian writer to be reckoned with."

Awards 
Piano Lessons was shortlisted for a number of awards including best non-fiction at the NSW Premier's Literary Awards as well as best non-fiction at the 2010 Australian Book Industry Awards. Goldsworthy won Newcomer of the Year at the 2010 Australian Book Industry Awards.

References

Interviews
 "Anna Goldsworthy", interview with Anna Goldsmith, readings.com.au, 1 October 2009
 "An interview with Anna Goldsworthy", discussion with Black Inc., 29 September 2009
 Audio: ABC Radio National, The Music Show with Andrew Ford interview with Goldsworthy

PIANO COURSE==External links==
 Video – Video of the Australian book launch of Piano Lessons
 Book website – Official page for Piano Lessons
 A blog for the book
 Audio: Popular Twitter site
 Audio: Excerpt from the audio book version of Piano Lessons

Australian autobiographies
St. Martin's Press books
2009 non-fiction books
Music autobiographies
Piano
Black Inc books